The Japanese national ice hockey team may refer to:
Japan men's national ice hockey team
Japan men's national junior ice hockey team
Japan men's national under-18 ice hockey team
Japan women's national ice hockey team
Japan women's national under-18 ice hockey team